Progress tests are longitudinal, feedback oriented educational assessment tools for the evaluation of development and sustainability of cognitive knowledge during a learning process. A progress test is a written knowledge exam (usually involving multiple choice questions) that is usually administered to all students in the "A" program at the same time and at regular intervals (usually twice to four times yearly) throughout the entire academic program. The test samples the complete knowledge domain expected of new graduates upon completion of their courses, regardless of the year level of the student). The differences between students’ knowledge levels show in the test scores; the further a student has progressed in the curriculum the higher the scores. As a result, these resultant scores provide a longitudinal, repeated measures, curriculum-independent assessment of the objectives (in knowledge) of the entire programme.

History
Since its inception in the late 1970s at both Maastricht University and the University of Missouri–Kansas City independently, the progress test of applied knowledge has been increasingly used in medical and health sciences programs across the globe. They are well established and increasingly used in medical education in both undergraduate and postgraduate medical education. They are used formatively and summatively.

Use in academic programs
The progress test is currently used by national progress test consortia in the United Kingdom, Italy, The Netherlands, in Germany (including Austria), and in individual schools in Africa, Saudi Arabia, South East Asia, the Caribbean, Australia, New Zealand, Sweden, Finland,  UK, and the USA.  The National Board of Medical Examiners in the USA  also provides progress testing in various countries  The feasibility of an international approach to progress testing has been recently acknowledged  and was first demonstrated by Albano et al. in 1996, who compared test scores across German, Dutch and Italian medical schools. An international consortium has been established in Canada  involving faculties in Ireland, Australia, Canada, Portugal and the West Indies.

The progress test serves several important functions in academic programs. Considerable empirical evidence from medical schools in the Netherlands, Canada, United Kingdom and Ireland, as well postgraduate medical studies and schools in dentistry and psychology have shown that the longitudinal feature of the progress test provides a unique and demonstrable measurement of the growth and effectiveness of students’ knowledge acquisition throughout their course of study 

.

As a result, this information can be consistently used for diagnostic, remedial and prognostic teaching and learning interventions.  In the Netherlands, these interventions have been aided by the provision of a web-based results feedback system known as ProF  in which students can compare their results with their peers across different total and subtotal score perspectives, both across and within universities.

Additionally, the longitudinal data can serve as a transparent quality assurance measure for program reviews by providing an evaluation of the extent to which a school is meeting its curriculum objectives. The test also provides more reliable data for high-stakes assessment decisions by using measures of continuous learning rather than a one-shot method (Schuwirth, 2007).  Inter-university progress testing collaborations provide a means of improving the cost-effectiveness of assessments by sharing a larger pool of items, item writers, reviewers, and administrators. The collaborative approach adopted by the Dutch and other consortia has enabled the progress test to become a benchmarking instrument by which to measure the quality of educational outcomes in knowledge. The success of the progress test in these ways has led to consideration of developing an international progress test.

The benefits for all main stakeholders in a medical or health sciences programme make the progress test an appealing tool to invest resources and time for inclusion in an assessment regime. This attractiveness is demonstrated by its increasingly widespread use in individual medical education institutions and inter-faculty consortia around the world, and by its use for national and international benchmarking practices.

Advantages
Progress tests provide a rich source of information: the comprehensive nature in combination with the cross-sectional and longitudinal design offers a wealth of information both for individual learners as well as for curriculum evaluations.

Progress Testing fosters knowledge retention: the repeated testing of the same comprehensive domain of knowledge means that there is no point testing facts that could be remembered if studied the night before. Long term knowledge and knowledge retention is fostered because item content remains relevant long after the knowledge has been learned. Progress Testing removes the need for resit examinations: every new test occasion is a renewed opportunity to demonstrate growth of knowledge.

Progress Testing allows early detection of high achievers: some learners perform (far) beyond the expected level of their phase in training (e.g. they might have had relevant previous other training) and, depending on their performance, individual and more speeded pathways through the curriculum could be offered.

Progress Testing brings stability in assessment procedures: curriculum changes, changes in content, have no consequence for the progress test provided the end outcomes are unchanged.

Progress Testing provides excellent benchmarking opportunities: progress tests are not limited to a single school nor to PBL curricula and evaluations can easily be done to compare graduates and the effectiveness of different curriculum approaches.

Disadvantages
Naturally, there are disadvantages. The required resources for test development and scoring and the need for a central organization are two very important ones.

Scoring, psychometric procedures  for reducing test difficulty variation and standard setting procedures  are more complex in progress testing.

Finally progress tests do not work in heterogeneous programs with early specialization (like in many health sciences programs). In more homogenous programs, such as most medical programs, they work really well and pay off in relation to driving learning and use of resources.

International programs using progress testing
Information from 2010+ (this list may not be complete or up to date, please add any other known progress test administrations)

University of Minho, School of Medicine, Portugal

Netherlands Group - Five medical faculties in the Netherlands (Groningen, Leiden, Maastricht, Nijmegen and VU Amsterdam) and additionally, the Ghent University in Belgium use the test

International Partnership for Progress Testing (IPPT) - undergraduate medical programs at McMaster University Medical School, Canada; University of Limerick, Ireland; University of Algarve, Portugal; University of Western Sydney, Australia

Progress Test Medizin (PTM), Charité-Universitätsmedizin Berlin, Germany (Germany – Berlin, Aachen, Cologne, Münster, Witten, Duisburg-Essen, Oldenburg, Hamburg, Neuruppin, Düsseldorf, Augsburg, Bielefeld; Austria – Graz, Innsbruck, Vienna, Linz)

NBME 1 (Barts, St. George’s London, Leeds and Queens University, Belfast  UK)

NBME 2 (University of South Florida and Case Western Reserve University)

Southern Illinois University, Vanderbilt, University of New Mexico, Penn State, Texas Tech, Medical College of Georgia, University of Minnesota

University of Manchester School of Medicine, UK

Peninsula College of Medicine and Dentistry, UK

Cardiff University School of Medicine, Wales, UK

Swansea University Medical School, Wales, UK

University of Tampere, Finland

University of Helsinki, Finland

Karaganda State Medical University, Kazakhstan

Otago Medical School, New Zealand

Auckland Medical School, New Zealand

São Paulo City Medical School (UNICID), Brazil

University of Indonesia, Medical School

Catholic University of Mozambique

Pretoria, South Africa

CMIRA Program, Syrian-Lebanese Hospital Institute for Education and Research, Brazil

Alfaisal University - College of Medicine, Saudi Arabia

The College of Medicine at King Saud bin Abdulaziz University for Health Sciences (KSAU-HS), Saudi Arabia

Batterjee Medical College for Senescences & Technology Jeddah- Saudi Arabia

Sulaiman Alrajhi Colleges - School of Medicine, Albukairiyah city, Qassim region - Saudi Arabia
Source:

King Fisal University KFU - College of Medicine, Al-Ahsaa, Saudi Arabia

The College of Dentistry at King Saud bin Abdulaziz University for Health Sciences (KSAU-HS), Saudi Arabia

Flinders University - School of Medicine (post-graduate), Adelaide, Australia

See also
Medical education
Alfaisal University

References

External links
 Progress Test Medizin, Charité-Universitätsmedizin Berlin
 Progress test Saudi Arabia at Qassim College of Medicine
 interuniversity Progress Test Medicine, the Netherlands

Tests
Medical education